The 2011 Exeter City Council election took place on 5 May 2011, to elect members of Exeter City Council in Devon, England. The election was held concurrently with other local elections in England. One third of the council was up for election; the seats up for election  were last contested in 2007. The council remained under no overall control with the Labour Party as the largest party.

Results summary

Ward results

Alphington

Cowick

Duryard

Exwick

Heavitree

Mincinglake

Priory

St James

St Leonards

St Loyes

St Thomas

Topsham

Whipton & Barton

References

2011 English local elections
2011
2010s in Exeter